The tri-star is a novel wheel design—originally by Robert and John Forsyth, assigned to Lockheed in 1967—in which three wheels are arranged in an upright triangle with two on the ground and one above them. If either of the wheels in contact with the ground gets stuck, the whole system rotates over the obstruction.

Design
In the tri-star wheel, all three satellite wheels are simultaneously powered through a mechanical linkage between each satellite wheel and a shaft concentric with the central hub. In the original patent, the direction of the vehicle is controlled through the differential steering.

Applications
Lockheed modified an M2A2 105mm Light Howitzer and produced it from 1969-1977 with a drive unit and tri-star wheel system into an Auxiliary Propelled Howitzer they termed "Terra Star." The only surviving prototype is located at the Rock Island Arsenal Museum.

Its most famous application was the Landmaster, a unique armoured personnel carrier (APC) from the 1977 film Damnation Alley.

Its common application is employed as a stairclimber.

Gallery

References

External links
 Various tri-star vehicles 
 Tri-star wheels built with Lego 
 M2A2 Terra Star (in Russian)
 An article on M2A2 Terra Star
 Short entry in the May 1968 issue of Popular Science (page 86)

American inventions
Wheels